The Legend of Prince Valiant is a 1991–1993 American animated television series based on the Prince Valiant comic strip created by Hal Foster. Set in the time of King Arthur, it is a family-oriented adventure show about an exiled prince who goes on a quest to become one of the Knights of the Round Table. He begins his quest after having a dream about Camelot and its idealistic New Order. This television series originally aired on The Family Channel for a total run of 65 episodes.

Story summary

Premise

Like the original comic strip, the series begins with the fall of Thule, the fictional kingdom to which Prince Valiant is heir. Valiant, his parents, and a group of survivors from the castle are exiled by the ruthless conqueror Cynan to a hostile marsh across the sea. The young prince, deeply saddened by this defeat and vengeful towards Cynan, attempts to make the best of his new life but craves some greater purpose. He finds this purpose when he has a series of dreams about a kingdom called Camelot, King Arthur, Merlin, and the Knights of the Round Table. Valiant becomes enraptured with Camelot's New Order, which is founded on the ideas that might does not make right and that truth, justice, honor and friendship should be the guiding forces in people's dealings with each other. Against the wishes of his father, Valiant leaves the exiles' settlement in search of Camelot so that he may serve King Arthur as a Knight of the Round Table.

During his quest, the prince meets two peasants who fall under the spell of his dream and join him. The first that he meets is Arn, a wandering peasant with great skills as a woodsman but who is ashamed of his class, illiteracy, and clumsiness. The second is Rowanne, the daughter of a blacksmith, who is feisty, unorthodox, and an expert with a bow and arrow. These three quickly become best friends and find Camelot together. But before they can become knights, they must undergo training, face off against various enemies, and do a bit more growing up.

Season one (26 episodes)
The first few episodes of the series deal with establishing Valiant's backstory and character, uniting him with Arn and Rowanne, and locating Camelot. Two main story arcs guide the rest of the season: 1) Valiant's training and emotional maturity; 2) Cynan's growing threat to Camelot. Through trial and error, Valiant learns the value of humility, patience, responsibility, and controlling his temper. This serves him well as he encounters various emissaries, both good and evil, connected to Cynan that indicate his ambition to invade Camelot. By the end of the season, Valiant has proven himself enough to be allowed to lead an army back to Thule and reclaim his homeland from Cynan's forces. He successfully does so with the help of Arn, Rowanne, Merlin, and his father King Williem. The season ends with Valiant bidding farewell to his parents and childhood home, returning to Camelot, and being knighted by King Arthur. There are also several stand-alone adventures that cause the trio of Valiant, Arn, and Rowanne to grow in fame throughout the kingdom.

Several key storylines begin during the first season that would not be resolved until the following year. The most obvious is Arn and Rowanne's desire to be knighted — their training and coming of age sagas continue throughout the second season. The love triangle amongst the trio (where Arn and Valiant both have feelings for Rowanne and Rowanne cares for both of them equally) is pushed to the background towards the end of the season and will resurface with new complications later on. Recurring villain Duncan Draconarius slowly undergoes a process of redemption that has yet to be completed. Another character, Denys, is briefly introduced yet will come into his own as a recurring character during the second season. Conflicts that are left to percolate until the second year include Camelot's hostilities with the Viking nation, the fallout from the massacre of the Viking peace delegation, the threat posed by a newly exiled Sir Mordred, and the beginnings of popular discontent towards Arthur's New Order. Also unknown are the final fates of the villains Robert (who is never heard from again), Cynan, Dylan, and Lord Maldon.

Season two (39 episodes)
Three main story arcs guide the overall course of the second season: 1) Valiant settling in as a knight and honing his leadership abilities; 2) Arn and Rowanne coming to terms with their insecurities as they continue to work towards knighthood; 3) the growing threat posed by the various factions of Mordred's New Dawn, a corruption of Arthur's New Order. Mordred and his partner Lord Maldon prey upon the public's prejudice against non-native Camelotians and fear of an imminent Viking invasion. The situation grows steadily worse over the course of the season as Mordred forms alliances with Camelot's enemies (including the Viking nation and the Misty Isles) and a traitor within Camelot takes steps to ensure its downfall. By this time, Arn and Rowanne have both earned their spots at the Round Table, while Valiant has risen in status to become one of the leading knights of Camelot.

Towards the end of the series, King Arthur enacts a drastic plan to foil the New Dawn, a plan that goes awry due to Maldon and causes Arthur to be buried alive. Queen Guinevere then makes the surprise move of proclaiming Prince Valiant to be Arthur's chosen heir and the new King of Camelot. Camelot continues to lose ground against its enemies until a series of surprise events turn the tide of battle: the Vikings acquire information about Mordred that causes them to end their alliance; the general public revolts against the New Dawn's forces; Valiant defeats Mordred in combat and reclaims Excalibur; and Arthur returns alive and well. The series ends with King Arthur back on his throne and saluting the future of Camelot under the New Order as Valiant, Arn, and Rowanne stand by his side.

Other notable storylines develop over the course of the season that influence the main plot arcs. One is the introduction of Princess Aleta and King Hugo of the Misty Isles — these characters add new dimensions to the Valiant-Rowanne-Arn love triangle and the danger posed by Mordred's forces. The Northland storyline also complicates the love and war arcs while providing the catalyst for Arn and Rowanne to finally achieve knighthood. Duncan Draconarious is revisited in a few episodes that place him firmly on the side of Camelot. Several stories focus on Valiant's young squire Denys, including one that finalizes the fate of season one villains Cynan and Dylan. And of course, there are the stand-alone adventures that add to Valiant, Arn, and Rowanne's growing legend in Camelot.

Some unresolved and underdeveloped plot threads are worth pointing out at this juncture. One is Valiant and Aleta's marriage, an important part of the comic strip that never transpired onscreen (the two characters end the series betrothed). Another is Rowanne's relationship with King Michael of Northland, which developed rather abruptly and lacked definite closure as the series geared up for its big finale.  And the character of Lady Morgana, introduced in the first season with the potential to become a major antagonist, is forgotten about until the very end of the second season.

Characters

Main characters
Prince Valiant (voiced by Robby Benson) — Exiled prince of Thule. A courageous, noble, kind, and headstrong dreamer who is fiercely loyal to and protective of Camelot and his friends. Can be reckless and egotistical on occasion. Wields the Singing Sword, sister blade to Excalibur, and rides a black horse named Caliburn. Knighted after defeating Cynan. Falls in love with Princess Aleta on first sight. Matures later on and briefly becomes King of Camelot. The only character to appear in every episode of the series.
Arn (voiced by Michael Horton) — Insecure but good-hearted wandering woodsman. Believes he is unworthy of knighthood due to his illiteracy, social status, and occasional clumsiness. Possesses great tracking and survival skills; rides a brown horse named Crux. Orphaned in a Viking raid, he now considers Valiant and Rowanne his family. Harbors an unrequited love for Rowanne. Later knighted after defeating the treacherous Baron of Lionsgate and his son who were plotting against Camelot.
Rowanne of Bridgesford (voiced by Noelle North) — Strong-willed, spirited peasant who rejects tradition. Determined to become the first female Knight of the Round Table; rides a white horse that is never named. Temperamental and stubborn, but a romantic at heart, which leads to vicious love triangles and fits of jealousy. A highly proficient archer who learned the blacksmithing trade from her father.  After stopping numerous plots against Highland and Camelot, was knighted at the same time as Arn, choosing Camelot over her courtship with King Michael.
Merlin (voiced by Alan Oppenheimer) — Mysterious royal advisor. Possesses great wisdom and a knowledge of alchemy and other sciences that laymen mistake as magic. An intellectual man who remains in good physical shape despite his age. Traveled the world in his youth, then raised and protected Arthur from infancy. Mentors Arthur and Valiant through direct counsel and cryptic suggestions.
King Arthur (voiced by Efrem Zimbalist, Jr.) — Ruler of Camelot and founder of the New Order. A living legend to his people since the day he freed Excalibur from a stone. Stern and fair, he firmly believes in ruling through peace, truth, and honor rather than warfare. Extremely sensitive to betrayal, especially that of Sir Mordred. Enjoys an affectionate marriage to Guinevere and a lasting friendship with Merlin. Regards Valiant as central to the future of Camelot.
Sir Gawain (voiced by Tim Curry) — Egotistical veteran Knight of the Round Table. A mighty warrior who is considered the brawn of the Gawain-Bryant duo. Justifiably renowned and respected, he's one of four knights who survived the legendary Combat of the Thirty. A ladies' man with a short fuse when anyone threatens or insults his king. Trains Valiant, Arn, and Rowanne, forming a particularly close bond with Valiant.
Queen Guinevere (voiced by Samantha Eggar) — Serene and elegant ruler of Camelot. An intelligent and strong woman who is fully capable of taking the lead in a crisis. In charge of the kingdom's cultural activities and fully supports the New Order. Deeply in love with her husband Arthur, she serves a calming influence on him. Regrets not having children, but sees Valiant and his friends as Camelot's second generation.
Sir Bryant (voiced by James Avery & Dorian Harewood) — Stoic and just veteran Knight of the Round Table. A noble, thinking-man's warrior who is considered the brains of the Gawain-Braynt duo. Emigrated from Iberia (where he was a prince) with his wife and son, who were subsequently murdered by highwaymen. Takes his responsibilities as a knight and role model extremely seriously. Trains Valiant, Arn, and Rowanne for knighthood.

Recurring characters
King Willem (voiced by Peter Renaday) — Valiant's father; King of Thule.
Queen Briana (voiced by Marnie Mosiman) — Valiant's mother; Queen of Thule. Her name is given in episode "The Dream Come True".
Rolf – (voiced by Dan Gilvezan) Williem's Lord of Arms, early mentor to Valiant. Killed by a rogue knight.
King Cynan (voiced by Tony Jay) — Ruthless conqueror of Thule with ambitions to invade Camelot; father of Dylan and Denys. Main antagonist of the first series.
Cedric (voiced by Brian Cummings) — Rowanne's father; a blacksmith in Bridgesford. Gave Valiant the Singing Sword.
Elizabeth (voiced by Diane Pershing) — Rowanne's mother.
Duncan Draconarius (voiced by Neil Ross) — The corrupt baron who governs Bridgesford. Deposed by Valiant and ventures to Camelot for sanctuary. Opposes the New Order until its ideals cause Arthur to spare his life. Sent to Kengary to pay for a crime he committed against that kingdom. Later becomes its king. Originally competed with Arthur for Guinevere's hand in marriage. 
Robert Draconarius (voiced by Rob Paulsen) — Duncan's younger brother, the Sheriff of Bridgesford. Had high hopes of marrying Rowanne. Deposed when his brother lost power.
Sir Mordred (voiced by Simon Templeman) — Champion of Camelot and an old friend of Arthur's. Believes that might makes right and peace can only be preserved through warfare. Secretly murdered a Viking peace delegation years earlier. Founded the New Dawn with the hopes of dethroning Arthur and ruling Camelot his way. Main antagonist of the second series.
Lady Morgana (voiced by Patty Duke & Diana Muldaur) — Arthur's older half-sister, Mordred's early lover, an alchemist. Rival of Merlin.
The Mighty Om (voiced by Clive Revill) — Merlin's eccentric former pupil and loyal friend.
Sir Kay (voiced by Jameson Parker) – Veteran Knight of the Round Table, later a traitor and murderer of King Hugo. Was killed by a virus that Morgana infected him with.
Dylan (voiced by Sean Astin & Jordan Jacobson) – Cynan's treacherous eldest son. Put in a coma by his father's deeds.
Lord Maldon (voiced by Jeff Bennett) — Bitter and vindictive son of one of Arthur's old enemies. Supports the New Dawn for his own purposes. A bell-maker who knows the formula for gunpowder (and was severely disfigured in an explosion).
Denys (voiced by Jack Lynch) — Younger son of Cynan. Valiant's squire and surrogate younger brother. Like the prince, he's drawn to Camelot because of a dream and yearns to become a knight. 
Owen (voiced by Michael York) — Weapons Master of Thule, whose family is slaughtered by Cynan. Disavows his allegiance to Williem and joins the New Dawn.
Aleta (voiced by Paige O'Hara) — Impetuous and often prideful Princess (later Queen) of the Misty Isles. A competent fighter who steadfastly believes in the ideals of the New Order. Falls in love with Valiant shortly after meeting him.
King Hugo (voiced by John Rhys-Davies) — Aleta's father; ruler of the Misty Isles. Exiled forty years ago for attempting to dethrone Arthur. A surly man who is disinclined to let go of old grudges. Hugo is murdered by Sir Kay.
Prince Michael (voiced by Wil Wheaton) — Prince (later King) of Northland who is committed to the New Order in Season 2. Falls for Rowanne shortly after meeting her; offers to knight her if she stays in Northland as his queen.
Duke of Lionsgate (voiced by David Warner) — A Duke from Northland, opposed to peace with Camelot. Attempts to exert control over his nephew Prince (later King) Michael.
Bosleigh (voiced by Gregg Berger) — Son of the Duke of Lionsgate; opposed to peace between Northland and Camelot. Accidentally killed by an arrow fired by the Duke, who was aiming for Arn.
Selena (voiced by Teri Garr) — Sage Advisor of Northland who attempts to manipulate Michael to satisfy her own agenda. Merlin had her banished from their homeland which she openly plays against him.
Allyn (voiced by Stephen Wolfe Smith) — Peasant who is prejudiced against non-native Camelotians. He's enticed by Lord Maldon to join the New Dawn.

Themes
The New Order
Dawn/sunlight
Destiny
Maturity, coming of age
Friendship
Tolerance/prejudice
Trust/betrayal
Forgiveness/vengeance
Knighthood/The Round Table

Connections to Arthurian lore and the comic strip
The characters of King Arthur, Queen Guinevere, Merlin, Sir Gawain, Sir Mordred, Lady Morgana, and Sir Kay are all major characters with origins in Arthurian legend. Also pulled from traditional lore are Camelot, the Knights of the Round Table, and Arthur's sword Excalibur. The general chivalric principles Camelot is famous for have been codified on this series as the New Order. In addition, the second-season episode "The Black Rose" features the characters of King Lot, King Uther, and Queen Igraine in a flashback episode that retells the famous "sword in the stone" legend.

Like the television series, the Prince Valiant comic strip is set in the world of King Arthur and features the above list of major characters amongst its cast. Both the comics and the TV show have the characters of Prince Valiant and Queen Aleta as well as their respective realms — Thule and the Misty Isles — and Valiant's Singing Sword. There are two Arns in the comic book continuity: a young prince who is Valiant's rival for a beautiful maiden, and Valiant and Aleta's firstborn son. The latter character grows up to become a heroic figure equal in importance to his father. In the comics, Valiant's father is named Aguar instead of Williem, while his mother in the comics is unnamed (she is called Briana on the series). In the comics Thule is conquered by a tyrant named Sligon (who has a daughter and no sons) rather than Cynan. There are several situations, adventures, and minor characters from the comics that are retold in the animated series.

Rowanne and Sir Bryant are the two major characters from the television show that do not have counterparts in Arthurian legends or the long running Prince Valiant comic strip.

Merchandise

Soundtrack
The Legend of Prince Valiant Soundtrack consists of eighteen tracks of background themes produced, composed and performed by the instrumental duo Exchange (Gerald O’Brien and Steve Sexton). The soundtrack is noteworthy for including the full version of the show's opening theme (Where the Truth Lies) as well as a pop song using the show's love music (Love Called Out My Name).

Track listing
"Where the Truth Lies" (performed by Exchange featuring Marc Jordan)
"Celebration Dance"
"Sir Bryant"
"Love Called Out My Name" (performed by Exchange featuring Amy Sky and Marc Jordan)
"Guinevere"
"Search and Journey"
"In the Shadows"
"Valiant's Theme"
"A Monks Evil Drone"
"Ending Title Theme"
"The Majesty's Feast"
"The Serenade"
"Valiant & Rolf"
"Victory March"
"All Alone"
"Danger is Near"
"Valiant Leaves Home"
"Where the Truth Lies (reprise)"

Video games
In 1991 and 1992, King Features Syndicate licensed the rights to Ocean Software to make video game versions of The Legend of Prince Valiant television series for Nintendo Entertainment System (developed by Special FX Software and published only in Europe) and Game Boy (developed by Sculptured Software and got published by Electro Brain outside of Europe as Kingdom Crusade). The NES version is a fighter/action game and tells the story of Valiant's search for Camelot at the beginning of season one. The player controls Valiant, enabling him to walk, jump, and throw things at opponents. Typical obstacles are pit traps, water hazards and Archers embedded in the background who shoot like turrets from a stationary position. The Game Boy version is a strategy game where all fighting is done in an arcade manner rather than a typical manner of a strategy or role-playing game. Each player must either destroy all of the opponent's units or capture all the castles in order to win the game and to defeat his or her opponent. Winning results in a celebration screen while losing is the equivalent to a game over.

DVD releases
BCI Eclipse LLC (under its Ink & Paint classic animation entertainment brand) (under license from Hearst Entertainment and SGC Entertainment) released the complete series on DVD for the very first time, in 2006/2007, in 2 volume sets.  Each set consists of 5 double-sided DVDs, with extras including cast/crew voiceover commentaries and bonus video interviews with the cast and show writers.  As of 2009, these releases have been discontinued and are out of print as BCI Eclipse ceased operations.

In March 2010, Mill Creek Entertainment announced that they had acquired the rights to the series.  They subsequently released Prince Valiant: The Complete 65 episode series on DVD in Region 1 on May 18, 2010.  This 5-disc set features all 65 episodes of the series on DVD, together in one collection for the very first time.

On 2004-05-04, MBL Group subsidiary Hollywood DVD released 2 episodes (The Dream and The Journey) on a single, all-region disc for the British market: The Legend Of Prince Valiant: The Dream ∙ The Journey

References

External links

The Legend of Prince Valiant Fan Website (archived)

Prince Valiant
1990s American animated television series
1991 American television series debuts
1993 American television series endings
American children's animated action television series
American children's animated adventure television series
American children's animated fantasy television series
English-language television shows
The Family Channel (American TV network, founded 1990) original programming
Television series based on Arthurian legend
Television shows based on comic strips